was a Japanese middle-distance runner. He competed in the men's 800 metres at the 1936 Summer Olympics.

References

External links
 

1910 births
Year of death missing
Japanese male middle-distance runners
Olympic male middle-distance runners
Olympic athletes of Japan
Athletes (track and field) at the 1936 Summer Olympics
Japan Championships in Athletics winners
20th-century Japanese people